Affinia Hotel Collection is a chain of boutique hotels offering accommodations in New York City in the United States. Each property has a focus: fitness, tranquility, or location. The corporate headquarters for Affinia Hotel Collection is located in New York City 

The chain has a stay customization program called 'My Affinia', which allows guests to personalize their stay prior to arrival.  Guests can request items such as yoga mats, guitars, cupcakes, sound pillows, hair diffusers and golf putters.

The first hotel was established in 1962 by Benjamin J. Denihan.  Currently the hotel chain is operated by DHG (Denihan Hospitality Group), a privately owned company. The company is a member of an alliance of hotels including Joie De Vivre (California), Thistle Hotels (United Kingdom), Rotana Hotels (Middle East) and First Hotels (Scandinavia).

Hotels 
Affinia brand
Dumont NYC
Gardens NYC
Manhattan NYC
Shelburne NYC

Restaurants 
Restaurants at Affinia Hotels

Rare Bar and Grill at Shelburne NYC, New York

Bars 
Bars at Affinia Hotels

Rare View hay
 Lounge at Shelburne NYC, New York

References

Hotel chains in the United States